Robert Joseph "Bobby Joe" Long (October 14, 1953 – May 23, 2019) was an American serial killer and rapist who was executed by the state of Florida for the murder of Michelle Denise Simms. Long abducted, sexually assaulted, and murdered at least ten women in the Tampa Bay area in Florida during an eight-month period in 1984. He released 17-year-old Lisa McVey after 26 hours. McVey provided critical information to the police that enabled them to arrest Long. Long was also a serial rapist.

Long was sentenced to death for two of the ten murders he was suspected of committing. He was executed by lethal injection on May 23, 2019.

Early life
Robert Joseph Long was born on October 14, 1953 in Kenova, West Virginia, to Joe and Louetta Long. Long was born with an extra X chromosome, also known as 47,XXY, a specific variant of Klinefelter syndrome. This condition results in excessive estrogen production yielding some female traits such as breast development. Long was teased as a child for his large breasts and underwent breast reduction surgery in adolescence. He had also suffered multiple head injuries as a child resulting from diverse accidents.

Long had a dysfunctional relationship with his mother; he slept in her bed until he was a teenager and reportedly resented her multiple short-term boyfriends she brought with her when returning home late at night from her job. Long married his high school girlfriend in 1974, with whom he had two children before she filed for divorce in 1980.

Crimes

Long committed at least 50 rapes as the "Classified Ad Rapist" in Fort Lauderdale, Ocala, Miami, and Dade County. Starting around 1981, Long began contacting women through the Penny Saver and other classified ads. When Long found a woman alone, he asked to use the bathroom, took out his "rape kit" and raped and robbed the woman. Long was tried and convicted for rape in 1981 but requested a new trial, which was granted. The charges were later dropped.

Long moved to the Tampa Bay area in 1983. In 1984, while on probation for assault, Long raped and strangled 20-year-old Artiss "Ann" Wick in March; her body was discovered in a rural area on November 22, 1984. She had reportedly hitch-hiked from Gas City, Indiana to Tampa, and was engaged to be married.

Over the next eight months, Long abducted, raped, and murdered at least 10 women in three counties in the Tampa Bay area (Hillsborough, Pasco, and Pinellas). The investigation involved personnel from the Hillsborough County Sheriff's Office (HCSO), the FBI, the Tampa Police Department (TPD), the Pasco County Sheriff's Office (PCSO), and the Florida Department of Law Enforcement (FDLE).

The bodies of the victims were typically found in a state of decomposition long after the murders, having been dumped near a rural roadside or dragged into the woods. Long appears to have targeted vulnerable women, including abducting women walking alone and those working as sex workers, persuading women to enter his car where he would rape and torture them. Of Long's 10 known victims, five of the women were identified as known sex workers, two as exotic dancers. The remaining three victims were a factory worker, a student, and one with an unknown occupation.

During this period, Long also continued his classified-ad rapes, attacking 33-year-old Linda Nuttall in her home.

In the early hours of November 3, 1984, Long abducted 17-year-old Lisa McVey as she rode her bike home from work. She was blindfolded and taken to Long's home, where he repeatedly raped her. Aware of the danger she was in, the blindfolded McVey reported leaving as many fingerprints in Long's home as she could to aid any future police investigation. After 26 hours, Long released McVey and she provided investigators with information on his home, car and a time period in which she heard him use an ATM. This led to police identifying Long and he was arrested on November 16, 1984. He was linked to the murders through red carpet fibers found on the bodies of several victims.

Known victims
 Artiss "Ann" Wick, 20 – killed on March 27, 1984
 Ngeun Thi Long, 19 – killed on May 13, 1984
 Michelle Denise Simms, 22 – killed on May 27, 1984
 Linda Nuttall, 33 – assaulted in May 1984; survived
 Elizabeth Loudenback, 22 – killed on June 8, 1984
 Vicky Marie Elliott, 21 – killed on September 7, 1984
 Chanel Devoun Williams, 18 – killed on October 7, 1984
 Karen Beth Dinsfriend, 28 – killed on October 14, 1984
 Kimberly Kyle Hopps, 22 – killed on October 31, 1984
 Lisa McVey, 17 – assaulted on November 3, 1984; survived
 Virginia Lee Johnson, 18 – killed on November 6, 1984
 Kim Marie Swann, 21 – killed on November 11, 1984

Capture
At the time of his capture, Long was wanted in three Tampa Bay area jurisdictions where investigators had collected multiple forms of forensic evidence, including clothing, carpet fibers, semen, ligature marks, and rope knots.

Long was arrested outside a movie theater on November 16, 1984, and charged with the sexual battery and kidnapping of Lisa McVey. Long signed a formal Miranda waiver, and consented to questioning. After the detectives procured a confession for the McVey case, their questioning focused on a series of unsolved sexual battery homicides in the Tampa Bay area. As the detectives questioned Long about the murders, he replied, "I'd rather not answer that."

The detectives continued the interrogation, and handed Long photographs of the various murder victims. At this point, Long stated, "The complexion of things sure have [sic] changed since you came back into the room. I think I might need an attorney." No attorney was provided, and Long eventually confessed to eight murders in Hillsborough County, and one murder in Pasco County.

Fiber evidence analysis by the FBI linked Long's vehicle to most of his victims.

Trial
The Hillsborough County State Attorney's Office and the Public Defender's Office of Hillsborough County reached a plea bargain deal. Long pled guilty on September 24, 1985, to eight of the homicides and the abduction and rape of Lisa McVey, receiving 26 life sentences without the possibility of parole (24 concurrent and two to run consecutively to the first 24) and seven life sentences with the possibility of parole after 25 years.

The State retained the option to seek the death penalty for the murder of Michelle Simms. In July 1986, Long was found guilty and was sentenced to die in Florida's electric chair.

Although Long confessed to raping and killing women, his confession was thrown out. His trial proceeded straight to the penalty phase, which was possible in the 1980s. In early 1985, he received the death penalty.

Long was convicted and appealed his first degree murder conviction and death sentence for crimes committed in Hillsborough County.

Long appealed his first degree murder conviction and sentence of death in the death of Virginia Johnson.

On appeal, Long's death sentence was vacated, his conviction reversed, and his case remanded back to the trial court with directions to enter an order of acquittal for the murder of Virginia Johnson.

On February 24, 1999, Long accused the Capital Collateral Regional Council (the state office defending death row inmates in their appeals) of revealing his private letters to a book author, thus violating attorney–client privilege. He also accused the agency of running a "death pool," betting on the dates on which inmates would be executed, and asked that the agency be removed from his case. An investigation concluded that these allegations were unfounded. Long's petition for a writ of mandamus to require Bob Dillinger, the public defender for the Sixth Judicial Circuit, to relinquish possession and control of his file in State v. Long, was denied.

According to the Florida Department of Corrections, Long was ultimately serving one five-year sentence, four 99-year sentences, 28 life sentences, and one death sentence.

Execution
On April 23, 2019, Florida Governor Ron DeSantis signed Long's death warrant, the first death warrant he had signed since taking office in January 2019. Long's subsequent appeals were denied and he was executed by lethal injection on May 23, 2019, more than 30 years after his conviction. He ate his final meal at 9:30a.m. local time; he requested roast beef, bacon, french fries and soda. He was pronounced dead at 7:00p.m. and had made no last statement.

Some documentaries relating to Long's crimes 

 The FBI Files, Season 1, episode 7: "Killing Spree"
 Forensic Files, Season 2, episode 1: "The Common Thread"
 I Survived..., Season 2, episode 7
 I Escaped My Killer, Season 1, episode 1 (Crime & Investigation Network)
 Killer Doctors on Death Row (CBS Reality) 
 Evil Lives Here, Season 3, episode 2: "The Monster I Married" (Investigation Discovery)
 World's Most Evil Killers, "The Classified Ad Rapist: Bobby Joe Long" (Reelz)
 On the Case with Paula Zahn, Season 6, episode 5: “Hanging By A Thread” (Investigation Discovery)
 Monster in My Family, Season 1, episode 5: "Classified Ad Rapist: Bobby Joe Long"
 Mark of a Killer, Season 2, episode 7: “Collar and Leash” (Oxygen)

TV movies 
 Bobby Joe Long's story has been depicted in the Lifetime TV movie Believe Me: The Abduction of Lisa McVey which aired in 2018. The film stars Katie Douglas as Lisa McVey, Rossif Sutherland as Bobby Joe Long, and David James Elliott as Larry Pinkerton.

See also
 List of people executed in Florida
 List of people executed in the United States in 2019
 List of serial killers by number of victims
 List of serial killers in the United States
 Lonely hearts killer

References

External links
 Appeal in and for Hillsborough County, State of Florida
 
 Bobby Joe Long – Bio 
 The FBI Files, Season 1 – Ep 7: 
 Forensic Files, Season 2 – Ep 1: 

1953 births
1984 murders in the United States
2019 deaths
20th-century American criminals
21st-century executions by Florida
21st-century executions of American people
American kidnappers
American male criminals
American people convicted of assault
American people convicted of burglary
American rapists
American robbers
Broward College alumni
Crime in Florida
Crimes against sex workers in the United States
Executed American serial killers
Executed people from West Virginia
History of Tampa, Florida
Intersex men
Male serial killers
People convicted of murder by Florida
People from Kenova, West Virginia
People executed by Florida by lethal injection
Violence against women in the United States